The Santos Luzardo National Park Also Cinaruco-Capanaparo National Park It is a protected area with the status of national park that is located between the rivers Capanaparo and Cinaruco and the confluence of them with the Orinoco river, in jurisdiction of the Municipalities Pedro Camejo and Achaguas of the Apure State in Venezuela, near the border with Colombia.

The park was created in 1988 by presidential decree by President Jaime Lusinchi and is protected by the National Institute of Parks of Venezuela (INPARQUES), which assumes a systematic policy of conservation and preservation of the natural resources of the park.

The park has a variety of flora including Saladillo, conger, oak, caramacate, drago, saman, coconut monkey and cañafístula, among other plants.

Gallery

See also
List of national parks of Venezuela
Los Roques National Park

References

National parks of Venezuela
Protected areas established in 1988
Llanos
1988 establishments in Venezuela
Geography of Apure
Tourist attractions in Apure